An anti-society is a small, separate community intentionally created within a larger society as an alternative to or resistance of it. For example, Adam Podgórecki studied one anti-society composed of Polish prisoners; Bhaktiprasad Mallik of Sanskrit College studied another composed of criminals in Calcutta.

Anti-languages are developed by these societies as a means to prevent outsiders from understanding their communication, and as a manner of establishing a subculture that meets the needs of their alternative social structure. Anti-languages differ from slang and jargon in that they are used solely among ostracised or rebellious social groups including prisoners, criminals, homosexuals, and teenagers.

References

Sociological theories